GKI may refer to:

 Great Keppel Island, Queensland, Australia
 Indonesia Christian Church